The 1908 United States presidential election in South Dakota took place on November 3, 1908. Voters chose four representatives, or electors to the Electoral College, who voted for president and vice president.

South Dakota voted for the Republican nominee, Secretary of War William Howard Taft, over the Democratic nominee, former U.S. Representative William Jennings Bryan. Taft won the state by a margin of 23.76 percentage points.

William Bryan had previously won South Dakota during his run against William McKinley in 1896 but would later lose the state to McKinley four years later in 1900.

Results

Results by county

See also
 United States presidential elections in South Dakota

References

South Dakota
1908
1908 South Dakota elections